Matteo Della Morte (born 13 October 1999) is an Italian footballer who plays as a midfielder for  club Vicenza.

Club career
He made his Serie B debut for Pro Vercelli on 2 December 2017 in a game against Parma.

On 30 January 2023, Della Morte signed a 3.5-year contract with Vicenza.

References

External links
 

1999 births
Living people
Sportspeople from the Metropolitan City of Turin
Footballers from Piedmont
Italian footballers
Association football midfielders
Serie B players
Serie C players
F.C. Pro Vercelli 1892 players
Paganese Calcio 1926 players
L.R. Vicenza players